The Cantieri navali Tosi di Taranto (Tosi Shipyard at Taranto) is a defunct Italian shipyard founded in 1914 by engineering company Franco Tosi & C. Between World War I and World War II it specialized in building submarines. The company never really recovered from the devastation from World War II and it was one of the first acquisitions of the newly formed financial holding company, Fincantieri, on 29 December 1959. The shipyard closed on 31 December 1990.

History

Ships built 

Some of the vessels built at this shipyard are listed below.

Submarines 
For the Regia Marina
 N class : 2 of 6 units, built 1917-19
Mameli class : 4 units, built 1926–28
Bragadin class : 2 units, built 1929–30
Settembrini class : 2 units, built 1930–31
Argonauta class : 2 of 7 units, built 1931–32
Sirena class : 2 of 12 units, built 1933
Archimede class : 4 units, built 1933–34
Micca class : 1 unit, built 1935
Adua class : 4 of 17 units, built 1936–38
Foca class : 3 units, built 1937–38
Brin class : 5 units, built 1938–39
Liuzzi class : 4 units, built 1939–40
Acciaio class : 3 of 13 units, built 1941–42 
 Romolo class : 2 of 12 units built, 1943
Flutto class  (Type I): 2  units 1943 (not completed)

For the Marina Militare
 Pietro Calvi (1959)

For foreign navies
 Santa Fe (1931) - Argentine Navy
 Santiago del Estero (1932) - Argentine Navy
 Salta (1932) - Argentine Navy

Warships 
 Tarantola (1942) - ammunition transport, Regia Marina
 Canopo D-570 (1955) - frigate, Marina Militare
 Cigno D-572 (1955) - frigate, Marina Militare
 Castore D-573 (1955) - frigate, Marina Militare
  Trifoglio M 5541 (1955) - minesweeper, Marina Militare

Other ships 
 Principessa Giovanna (1923) - passenger ship, later converted to hospital ship
 Epomeo (1929) - passenger ship, later converted to auxiliary cruiser
 Lago Zuai (1939) - cargo ship, later converted to auxiliary cruiser
 Sestriere (1943) - passenger ship
 Sises  (1948) - passenger ship
 Paşabahçe (1952) - laid down for Regia Marina during WWII, later converted to passenger ship for İstanbul Şehir Hatları

References

Bibliography 

Shipyards of Italy
Franco Tosi Meccanica
Fincantieri
Shipbuilding companies of Italy